Programming the Z80 is a seminal computer programming text, written by Rodnay Zaks and first published in 1979 by Sybex. It is designed as both an educational text to teach programming techniques of elementary to intermediate level using assembly language, and as a self-contained reference book. It covers more general concepts, such as information representation and data structures, and describes in detail topics specific to the Zilog Z80 microprocessor, such as its internal hardware organisation and instruction set. The book is considered an indispensable reference guide by many Z80 programmers. It was also published by RadioShack with the title How To Program The Z80. In 1983, Sybex published a companion volume, Z80 Applications written by James W. Coffron.

Contents

Preface
Basic Concepts
Z80 Hardware Organization
Basic Programming Techniques
The Z80 Instruction Set
Addressing Techniques
Input/Output Techniques
Input/Output Devices
Application Examples
Data Structures
Program Development
Conclusion

Appendices
A. Hexadecimal Conversion Table
B. ASCII Conversion Table
C. Relative Branch Tables
D. Decimal to BCD Conversion
E. Z80 Instruction Codes
F. Z80 to 8080 Equivalence
G. 8080 to Z80 Equivalence

External links
 PDF, RadioShack edition

Computer programming books
1979 non-fiction books
Z80